Dalbergiella is a genus of flowering plants in the legume family, Fabaceae. It belongs to the subfamily Faboideae. 

Species include: 

 Dalbergiella nyasae
 Dalbergiella welwitschii, also known as west African blackwood.

References 

Millettieae
Fabaceae genera